Omphalotropis elegans is a species of minute salt marsh snail with an operculum, a terrestrial gastropod mollusk, or micromollusk, in the family Assimineidae. This species is endemic to Guam.

References

Fauna of Guam
Omphalotropis
Assimineidae
Gastropods described in 1894
Taxonomy articles created by Polbot